The 2010 Central Oklahoma Bronchos football team represented the University of Central Oklahoma in the 2010 NCAA Division II football season, the 105th season of Broncho football. The team was led by fourth year head coach Tracy Holland. They played their home games at Wantland Stadium in Edmond, Oklahoma. The Bronchos were playing this season in their final year of membership in the Lone Star Conference, because they were changing conference affiliation to the Mid-America Intercollegiate Athletics Association.

The season began play began with loss to Pittsburg State at home on August 28, and ended with loss on the road to Angelo State on November 13. The Bronchos finished the season 2–9, with a conference record of 2–8 in conference play and 1–5 in the Lone Star North Division. The Lone Star Conference had a separate format for choosing conference champions and division champions.

Schedule

References

Central Oklahoma
Central Oklahoma Bronchos football seasons
Central Oklahoma Bronchos football